Negative refraction is the electromagnetic phenomenon where light rays become refracted at an interface that is opposite to their more commonly observed positive refractive properties. Negative refraction can be obtained by using a metamaterial which has been designed to achieve a negative value for (electric) permittivity (ε) and (magnetic) permeability (μ); in such cases the material can be assigned a negative refractive index. Such materials are sometimes called "double negative" materials.

Negative refraction occurs at interfaces between materials at which one has an ordinary positive phase velocity (i.e., a positive refractive index), and the other has the more exotic negative phase velocity (a negative refractive index).

Negative phase velocity

Negative phase velocity (NPV) is a property of light propagation in a medium. There are different definitions of NPV; the most common is Victor Veselago's original proposal of opposition of the wave vector and (Abraham) the Poynting vector. Other definitions include the opposition of wave vector to group velocity, and energy to velocity. "Phase velocity" is used conventionally, as phase velocity has the same sign as the wave vector.

A typical criterion used to determine Veselago's NPV is that the dot product of the Poynting vector and wave vector is negative (i.e., that ), but this definition is not covariant. While this restriction is not practically significant, the criterion has been generalized into a covariant form. Veselago NPV media are also called "left-handed (meta)materials", as the components of plane waves passing through (electric field, magnetic field, and wave vector) follow the left-hand rule instead of the right-hand rule. The terms "left-handed" and "right-handed" are generally avoided as they are also used to refer to chiral media.

Negative refractive index 

One can choose to avoid directly considering the Poynting vector and wave vector of a propagating light field, and instead directly consider the response of the materials. Assuming the material is achiral, one can consider what values of permittivity (ε) and permeability (µ) result in negative phase velocity (NPV).  Since both ε and µ are generally complex, their imaginary parts do not have to be negative for a passive (i.e. lossy) material to display negative refraction. In these materials, the criterion for negative phase velocity is derived by Depine and Lakhtakia to be

where  are the real valued parts of ε and µ, respectively. For active materials, the criterion is different. 

NPV occurrence does not necessarily imply negative refraction (negative refractive index). Typically, the refractive index  is determined using

,

However, in NPV materials, the negative square root is chosen to mimic the fact that the wave vector and phase velocity are also reversed. The refractive index is a derived quantity that describes how the wavevector is related to the optical frequency and propagation direction of the light; thus, the sign of  must be chosen to match the physical situation.

In chiral materials 
The refractive index  also depends on the chirality parameter , resulting in distinct values for left and right circularly polarized waves, given by

.

A negative refractive index occurs for one polarization if  > ; in this case,  and/or  do not need to be negative. A negative refractive index due to chirality was predicted by Pendry and Tretyakov et al., and first observed simultaneously and independently by Plum et al. and Zhang et al. in 2009.

Refraction
The consequence of negative refraction is light rays are refracted on the same side of the normal on entering the material, as indicated in the diagram, and by a general form of Snell's law.

See also 
Acoustic metamaterials
Metamaterial
Negative index metamaterials
Metamaterial antennas
Multiple-prism dispersion theory
N-slit interferometric equation
Perfect lens
Photonic metamaterials
Photonic crystal
Seismic metamaterials
Split-ring resonator
Tunable metamaterials

Electromagnetic interactions
Bloch's theorem
Casimir effect
Dielectric
Electromagnetism
EM radiation
Electron mobility
Permeability (electromagnetism)*
Permittivity*
Wavenumber
Photo-Dember
Impedance

References

Photonics
Physical phenomena
Metamaterials
Articles containing video clips